J. A. Caldwell was an American politician and county sheriff. A Democrat, he served in the Nevada Assembly between 1876 and 1878.

Caldwell became sheriff of Nye County after he was elected to that office on November 5, 1872. He was re-elected after his first term ended, and served until the elections on November 7, 1876. During those elections, Caldwell was elected as one of the two representatives of Nye County in the Assembly. The other representative was Thomas J. Bell.

Caldwell's term started the next day, and he served in one session. His mandate ended in November 1878 following the next elections, where W.B. Taylor and Joseph T. Williams were chosen as Caldwell and Bell's successors.

References

Democratic Party members of the Nevada Assembly
Nevada sheriffs
People from Nye County, Nevada
Place of birth missing
Place of death missing
Year of birth missing
Year of death missing